HyperParadise is the fourth album from Australian hip-hop artists Hermitude. It was released on 3 February 2012.

At the J Awards of 2012, the album was nominated for Australian Album of the Year.

At the AIR Awards of 2012, the album won Best Independent Dance/Electronic Album.

Singles
Three singles were released from HyperParadise. "Get in My Life", was released in November 2010. The second, "Speak of the Devil", was released on 9 September 2011. "Speak of the Devil" won the 2011 Triple J Award for Music Video of the Year. The same track scored number 44 on the 2011 Triple J Hottest 100. "HyperParadise" was released as the third and final single. A Flume remix saw the song peak at number 38 on the ARIA Charts, becoming the group's first charting single.

Reception
Andrew Hickey from Beat described the album as "instantly listenable" and "epic". He states Hermitude has been able to "expertly weave through genres and influences to create a unique sound". The Orange Press described the album as "yet another quantum leap ahead". The review concludes by stating "if there's any justice, this album will be the one that finally launches them into the upper stratosphere of producers, both here and abroad". Dominic Sciberras from Purple Sneakers states Hermitude "utilize their wide array of skills to create a sophisticated yet immensely listener friendly record". He describes Hermitude as "happy doing their own thing" by "defying trends and ignoring hype".

Track listing

Charts

References

2012 albums
Hermitude albums